Tales From Te Papa is a television series of mini-documentaries about objects from the collection of the Museum of New Zealand Te Papa Tongarewa (Te Papa) and the activities of the Museum staff. The series is a partnership between Television New Zealand and the Museum of New Zealand Te Papa Tongarewa.  The series was commissioned by Television New Zealand for TVNZ6, a digital channel and New Zealand's first fully public service broadcasting channel without advertising breaks.  Each episode runs for 5 to 8 minutes and shows on rotation in what would be the advertising break between programmes. Since TVNZ6 changed format to TVNZU on 1 March 2011 the series was moved to TVNZ7 and now available on You Tube.

The series was made by the Gibson Group and each episode produced by Gary Scott and hosted by either Simon Morton or Riria Hotere. A host interviews subject experts about a particular object or the behind-the-scenes work the Museum does.

Series 2009 Episodes 1 – 50

Series 2010 Episodes 51 – 100

References 

New Zealand documentary television series
TVNZ 7 original programming
Historical objects